Barrier is an unincorporated community in Wayne County, in the U.S. state of Kentucky. The community is located on Kentucky Route 92.

History
A post office was established at Barrier in 1902, and remained in operation until 1974. The community derives its name from Rev. Richard Barrier, an early settler.

Notable people
Hal Rogers, U.S. Representative

References

Unincorporated communities in Wayne County, Kentucky
Unincorporated communities in Kentucky